On the evening of 8 December 1980, English musician John Lennon, formerly of the Beatles, was shot and fatally wounded in the archway of the Dakota, his residence in New York City. The killer was Mark David Chapman, an American Beatles fan who was jealous and enraged by Lennon's rich lifestyle, alongside his 1966 comment that the Beatles were "more popular than Jesus". Chapman said he was inspired by the fictional character Holden Caulfield from J. D. Salinger's novel The Catcher in the Rye, a "phony-killer" who loathes hypocrisy.

Chapman planned the killing over several months and waited for Lennon at the Dakota on the morning of 8 December. Early in the evening, Chapman met Lennon, who signed his copy of the album Double Fantasy and subsequently left for a recording session at the Record Plant. Later that night, Lennon and his wife, Yoko Ono, returned to the Dakota. As Lennon and Ono approached the entrance of the building, Chapman fired five hollow-point bullets from a .38 special revolver, four of which hit Lennon in the back. Lennon was rushed to Roosevelt Hospital in a police car, where he was pronounced dead on arrival at 11:15 p.m. at age 40. Chapman remained at the scene reading The Catcher in the Rye until he was arrested by the police.

A worldwide outpouring of grief ensued; crowds gathered at Roosevelt Hospital and in front of the Dakota, and at least three Beatles fans died by suicide. The next day, Lennon was cremated at Ferncliff Cemetery in Hartsdale, New York.  In lieu of a funeral, Ono requested 10 minutes of silence around the world. Chapman later pleaded guilty to murdering Lennon and was given a sentence of 20-years-to-life imprisonment. He has been denied parole 12 times since he became eligible in 2000.

Background

Mark David Chapman
Mark David Chapman, a 25-year-old former security guard from Honolulu, Hawaii, was a fan of the Beatles with no prior criminal convictions.  J. D. Salinger's novel The Catcher in the Rye had taken on great personal significance for Chapman, to the extent that he wished to model his life after the novel's protagonist, Holden Caulfield. One of the novel's main themes is Caulfield's rage against adult hypocrisy and "phonies". Chapman claimed that he had been enraged by Lennon's infamous, much-publicised remark in 1966 that the Beatles were "more popular than Jesus", and by the lyrics of Lennon's songs "God", in which Lennon states that he does not believe in the Beatles, God or Jesus, and "Imagine", where Lennon states "imagine no possessions", yet had a lavish lifestyle as depicted in Anthony Fawcett's 1976 book John Lennon: One Day at a Time, making Lennon a "phony".

On 27 October 1980, Chapman purchased a five-shot .38 caliber Charter Arms revolver in Honolulu. He flew to New York on 29 October, after contacting the Federal Aviation Administration to learn the best way to transport a revolver. Chapman learned that bullets can be damaged on the plane, so he arrived without ammunition. He left New York on 12 or 13 November, then flew back on 6 December and checked into the Upper West Side YMCA for a night before moving to a Sheraton hotel in Midtown Manhattan.

8 December 1980
Chapman waited for Lennon outside the Dakota in early-morning and spent most of the day near the entrance to the Dakota, talking to fans and the doorman. During that morning, Chapman was distracted and missed seeing Lennon step out of a cab and enter the Dakota. Later in the morning, Chapman met Lennon's family nanny, Helen Seaman, who was returning from a walk with Lennon's five-year-old son Sean. Chapman reached in front of the housekeeper to shake Sean's hand and said that he was a beautiful boy, quoting Lennon's song "Beautiful Boy (Darling Boy)".

Portrait photographer Annie Leibovitz went to the Lennons' apartment to do a photo shoot for Rolling Stone magazine. Leibovitz promised them that a photo of the two of them naked together would make the front cover of the magazine. Leibovitz took several photos of John Lennon alone and one was originally set to be on the cover. Although Ono did not want to be naked, Lennon insisted that both he and his wife be on the cover, and after taking the pictures, Leibovitz left their apartment at 3:30 p.m. After the photo shoot, Lennon gave what would be his last interview, to RKO Radio Network's San Francisco DJ Dave Sholin and writer/producer Laurie Kaye, for a music show to be broadcast on the RKO Radio Network. At around 5 p.m., Lennon and Ono, delayed by a late limousine shared with the RKO Radio crew, left their apartment to mix the song "Walking on Thin Ice", an Ono song featuring Lennon on lead guitar, at the Record Plant.

As they left the building, they were approached by Chapman who asked for Lennon's autograph, a common practice, on a copy of his album, Double Fantasy. Lennon liked to give autographs or pictures, especially to those who had been waiting for long periods of time to meet him. Later, Chapman said, "He was very kind to me. Ironically, very kind and was very patient with me. The limousine was waiting ... and he took his time with me and he got the pen going and he signed my album. He asked me if I needed anything else. I said, 'No. No sir.' And he walked away. Very cordial and decent man." Paul Goresh, an amateur photographer and Lennon fan, took a photo of Lennon signing Chapman's album.

Murder

The Lennons returned to the Dakota at approximately 10:50 p.m. Lennon wanted to say goodnight to his son before going to the Stage Deli restaurant with Ono. The Lennons exited their limousine on 72nd Street instead of driving into the more secure courtyard of the Dakota. The Lennons passed Chapman and walked toward the archway entrance of the building. As Ono passed by, Chapman nodded at her. As Lennon passed by, he glanced briefly at Chapman, appearing to recognize him from earlier.

Based on statements made that night by New York City Police Department Chief of Detectives James Sullivan, numerous reports at the time claimed that Chapman called out "Mr. Lennon" and dropped into a combat stance before firing. Later court hearings and witness interviews did not include either of these details. Chapman said that he does not remember calling out to Lennon before he fired, and that Lennon did not turn around. He claimed to have taken a combat stance in a 1992 interview with Barbara Walters.

One bullet missed Lennon and struck a window of the Dakota. According to the autopsy report, two bullets entered the left side of Lennon's back, traveling through the left side of his chest and his left lung with one exiting from the body and one lodged in his neck. Two more bullets hit Lennon in his left shoulder. Lennon, bleeding profusely from his external wounds and from his mouth, staggered up five steps to the security/reception area where he said, "I'm shot! I'm shot!" He then fell to the floor, scattering cassettes that he was carrying.

Jose Perdomo, the doorman, shook the gun out of Chapman's hand and kicked it across the pavement. Concierge worker Jay Hastings first started to make a tourniquet, but upon ripping open Lennon's blood-stained shirt and realising the severity of his injuries, he covered Lennon's chest with his uniform jacket, removed his blood-covered glasses, and summoned the police. Chapman removed his coat and hat to show that he was not carrying any concealed weapons and remained standing on West 72nd Street, waiting for police to arrive. Underneath his coat, he wore a promotional T-shirt for Todd Rundgren's album Hermit of Mink Hollow. Perdomo shouted at Chapman, "Do you know what you just did?" to which Chapman calmly replied, "I just shot John Lennon."

Officers Steven Spiro and Peter Cullen were the first policemen to arrive at the scene; they were at 72nd Street and Broadway when they heard a report of shots fired at the Dakota. The officers arrived around two minutes later and found Chapman standing very calmly on West 72nd Street reading a paperback copy of J. D. Salinger's The Catcher in the Rye. They immediately put Chapman in handcuffs and placed him in the back seat of their squad car. Chapman made no attempt to flee or resist arrest. Cullen said of Chapman: "He apologized to us for ruining our night. I turned around and said to him, 'You've got to be fucking kidding me. You're worried about our night? Do you know what you just did to your life?' We read him his rights more than once."

Officer Herb Frauenberger and his partner Tony Palma were the second team arriving on the crime scene. They found Lennon lying face down on the floor of the reception area, blood pouring from his mouth and his clothing already soaked with it, with Hastings attending to him. Officers James Moran and Bill Gamble then arrived on the scene and Frauenberger put Lennon in their car, concluding his condition was too serious to wait for an ambulance to arrive. Moran and Gamble then drove Lennon to Roosevelt Hospital on West 59th Street, followed by Frauenberger and Palma, who drove Ono to the hospital. According to Gamble, in the car, Moran asked, "Are you John Lennon?" or "Do you know who you are?" Lennon nodded, but could only manage to make a moaning and gurgling sound when he tried to speak, and lost consciousness shortly thereafter.

Resuscitation attempt

A few minutes before 11:00 p.m., Moran arrived at Roosevelt Hospital with Lennon in his squad car. Moran was carrying Lennon on his back and onto a gurney, demanding a doctor for a multiple gunshot wound victim. When Lennon was brought in, he was not breathing, and had no pulse. Three doctors, a nurse, and two or three other medical attendants worked on Lennon for 10 to 20 minutes in an attempt to resuscitate him. As a last resort, the doctors cut open Lennon's chest and attempted manual heart massage to restore circulation, but they quickly discovered that the damage to the blood vessels above and around Lennon's heart from the multiple bullet wounds was too great.

Three of the four bullets that struck Lennon's back passed completely through his body and out of his chest, while the fourth lodged itself in his aorta beside his heart. One of the exiting bullets from his chest hit and became lodged in his upper left arm. Several of the wounds could have been fatal by themselves, because each bullet had ruptured vital arteries around the heart. Lennon was shot four times at close range with hollow-point bullets and his affected organs—particularly his left lung and major blood vessels above his heart—were virtually destroyed upon impact.

Reports regarding who operated on and attempted to resuscitate Lennon have been inconsistent.
Stephan Lynn, the head of the Emergency Department at Roosevelt Hospital, is usually credited with performing Lennon's surgery. In 2005, Lynn said he massaged Lennon's heart and attempted to resuscitate him for 20 minutes, that two other doctors were present, and that the three of them declared Lennon's death. Richard Marks, an emergency room surgeon at Roosevelt Hospital, stated in 1990 that he operated on Lennon, administered a "massive" blood transfusion, and provided heart massage to no avail. "When I realized he wasn't going to make it," said Marks, "I just sewed him back up. I felt helpless." David Halleran, who had been  a third-year general surgery resident at Roosevelt Hospital, disputed the accounts of both Marks and Lynn. In 2015, Halleran stated that the two doctors "didn't do anything", and that he did not initially realise the identity of the victim. He added that Lynn only came to assist him when he heard that it was Lennon.

According to his death certificate, Lennon was pronounced dead on arrival at 11:15 p.m., but the time of 11:07 p.m. has also been reported. Witnesses noted that the Beatles song "All My Loving" came over the hospital's sound system at the moment Lennon was pronounced dead.  Lennon's body was then taken to the city morgue at 520 First Avenue for an autopsy. The cause of death was reported on his death certificate as "hypovolemic shock, caused by the loss of more than 80% of blood volume due to multiple through-and-through gunshot wounds to the left shoulder and left chest resulting in damage to the left lung, the left subclavian artery, and both the aorta and aortic arch". According to the report, even with prompt medical treatment, no person could have lived for more than a few minutes with multiple bullet wounds affecting all of the major arteries and veins around the heart.

Media announcement

Ono asked the hospital not to report to the media that her husband was dead until she informed their five-year-old son Sean, who was at home. Ono said he was probably watching television and that she did not want him to learn of his father's death from a TV announcement. However, news producer Alan J. Weiss of WABC-TV happened to be waiting for treatment in the Roosevelt Hospital emergency room after being injured in a motorcycle crash earlier in the evening. Police officers wheeled Lennon into the same room as Weiss and mentioned what happened. Weiss called his station and relayed the information.

ABC News president Roone Arledge received word of the death during the last few moments of a national telecast of a Monday Night Football game between the New England Patriots and the Miami Dolphins, with the game tied and the Patriots about to attempt a field goal to win the game. Arledge informed Frank Gifford and Howard Cosell of the shooting and suggested that they report the murder. Cosell, who had interviewed Lennon during a Monday Night Football broadcast in 1974, was chosen to do so but balked at being the one to deliver the news. Gifford convinced Cosell otherwise, saying, "You’ve got to. If you know it, we’ve got to do it. Don’t hang on it. It’s a tragic moment, and this is going to shake up the whole world".

The news was broken as follows:

New York rock station WNEW-FM 102.7 immediately suspended all programming and opened its lines to calls from listeners. Stations throughout the country switched to special programming devoted to Lennon and/or Beatles music.

Reactions

Lennon's associates
According to Stephan Lynn, when he informed Ono of Lennon's death, she banged her head against the concrete floor of the hospital. His account is disputed by two of the nurses who were there. In a 2015 interview, Ono denied hitting her head on the floor and stated that her chief concern at the time was to remain calm and take care of her son, Sean. She was led away from Roosevelt Hospital by a policeman and Geffen Records president, David Geffen. The following day, Ono issued a statement: "There is no funeral for John. Later in the week we will set the time for a silent vigil to pray for his soul. We invite you to participate from wherever you are at the time. ... John loved and prayed for the human race. Please pray the same for him. Love. Yoko and Sean."

George Harrison issued a prepared statement for the press: "After all we went through together, I had and still have great love and respect for him. I am shocked and stunned. To rob a life is the ultimate robbery in life. The perpetual encroachment on other people's space is taken to the limit with the use of a gun. It is an outrage that people can take other people's lives when they obviously haven't got their own lives in order." Harrison later privately told friends, "I just wanted to be in a band. Here we are, 20 years later, and some whack job has shot my mate. I just wanted to play guitar in a band."

Paul McCartney addressed reporters outside his Sussex home that morning and said, "I can't take it at the moment. John was a great man who'll be remembered for his unique contributions to art, music and peace. He is going to be missed by the whole world." Later that day, McCartney was leaving an Oxford Street recording studio when reporters asked him for his reaction; he ended his response, "Drag, isn't it? Okay, cheers, bye-bye". His apparently casual response was widely criticised. McCartney later said that he had intended no disrespect and simply was unable to articulate his feelings, given the shock and sadness he felt over Lennon's murder. Reflecting on the day two years later, McCartney said the following: “How did I feel? I can't remember. I can't express it. I can't believe it. It was crazy. It was anger. It was fear. It was madness. It was the world coming to an end. And it was, 'Will it happen to me next?' I just felt everything. I still can't put into words. Shocking. And I ended up saying, 'It's a drag,' and that doesn't really sum it up."

Ringo Starr, who was in the Bahamas at the time, received a phone call from his stepchildren informing him about the murder. He flew to New York City to console Ono and played with Lennon's son, Sean.

Public response

Per Ono's wishes, on 14 December, millions of people around the world paused for ten minutes of silence to remember Lennon, including 30,000 people gathered in Lennon's hometown of Liverpool, and over 225,000 people at Naumburg Bandshell in Central Park, close to the scene of the shooting. For those ten minutes, every radio station in New York City went off the air.

At least three Beatles fans committed suicide after the murder, leading Ono to make a public appeal asking mourners not to give in to despair. On 18 January 1981, a full-page open letter from Ono appeared in The New York Times and The Washington Post. Titled "In Gratitude", it expressed thanks to the millions of people who mourned Lennon's loss and wanted to know how they could commemorate his life and help her and Sean.

Double Fantasy, which was released three weeks before Lennon's murder to mixed critical reaction and initially unremarkable sales, became a worldwide commercial success and won the 1981 Grammy Award for Album of the Year at the 24th Annual Grammy Awards.

Ono released a solo album, Season of Glass, in 1981. The cover of the album is a photograph of Lennon's blood-spattered glasses that he was wearing when he was shot. That same year, she also released "Walking on Thin Ice", the song the Lennons had mixed at the Record Plant less than an hour before he was murdered, as a single.

The attempted assassination of Ronald Reagan by John Hinckley Jr. took place three months after Lennon's murder, and the police found a copy of The Catcher in the Rye among Hinckley's personal belongings. Hinckley left a cassette tape in his hotel room on which he stated that he mourned Lennon's death. He said that he wanted to make "some kind of statement" after Lennon's death.

In June 2016 Jay Hastings, the Dakota concierge who tried to help Lennon, sold the shirt he was wearing that night, stained with Lennon's blood at an auction for $42,500.

Aftermath
The day after Lennon's murder, his remains were cremated at Ferncliff Cemetery in Hartsdale, Westchester County, New York, and his ashes were scattered in Central Park, in sight of their apartment. Chapman was taken to the 20th Precinct on West 82nd Street, where he was questioned for eight hours before being brought to New York County Criminal Court on Centre Street in Lower Manhattan. A judge remanded Chapman to Bellevue Hospital for psychiatric evaluation.

Meanwhile, Chapman was charged with second-degree murder of Lennon, as premeditation in New York state was not sufficient to warrant charge of first-degree murder. Despite advice by his lawyers to plead insanity, Chapman pleaded guilty to murdering Lennon, saying that his guilty plea was the will of God. Under the terms of his guilty plea, he was sentenced to 20-years-to-life with eligibility for parole in 2000. Before his sentencing, he was given the opportunity to address the court, at which point he read a passage from The Catcher in the Rye. As of September 2022, he has been denied parole 12 times and remains incarcerated at Green Haven Correctional Facility.

Memorials and tributes

Photography

Leibovitz's photo of a naked Lennon embracing his wife, taken on the day of the murder, was the cover of the 22 January 1981 issue of Rolling Stone, most of which was dedicated to articles, letters and photographs commemorating Lennon's life and death. In 2005, the American Society of Magazine Editors ranked it as the top magazine cover of the last 40 years.

Events

 Every 8 December, a remembrance ceremony is held in front of the Capitol Records building on Vine Street in Hollywood, California. People also light candles in front of Lennon's Hollywood Walk of Fame star, outside the Capitol Building.
 On 28–30 September 2007, Durness held the John Lennon Northern Lights Festival, which was attended by Lennon's half-sister, Julia Baird, who read from his writings and her own books; and Stanley Parkes, Lennon's Scottish cousin.
 Ono places a lit candle in the window of Lennon's room in the Dakota every year on 8 December.
 Every 9 October, Lennon's birthday, through 8 December, the date Lennon was shot, the Imagine Peace Tower in Iceland is lit.
 On 24 March 2018, Paul McCartney participated in the March for Our Lives, a protest against gun violence, because of Lennon's killing.

Music
 Bob Dylan wrote and recorded the song "Roll on John" on his 2012 album Tempest, which explicitly references the assassination ("They shot him in the back and down he went").
 David Bowie, who befriended Lennon while Lennon co-wrote and performed on Bowie's US #1 hit "Fame" in 1975, performed a tribute to Lennon in the final show of his Serious Moonlight Tour at the Hong Kong Coliseum, on 8 December 1983—the third anniversary of Lennon's death. Bowie said he last saw Lennon in Hong Kong, and performed Lennon's song "Imagine".
 David Gilmour of Pink Floyd wrote and recorded the song "Murder" in response to Lennon's death. It was released on his album About Face (1984).
 George Harrison released a tribute song, "All Those Years Ago" (1981), with Ringo Starr and Paul McCartney.
 Elton John, who recorded the US number-one hit "Whatever Gets You thru the Night" with Lennon, teamed up with his lyricist Bernie Taupin for the tribute "Empty Garden (Hey Hey Johnny)". It appeared on his album Jump Up! (1982), and peaked at No. 13 on the US Singles Chart that year. When he performed the song at a sold-out concert in Madison Square Garden in August 1982, he was joined on stage by Ono and Sean.
 Paul McCartney released his tribute, "Here Today", on his album Tug of War (1982).
 Paul Simon's homage to Lennon, "The Late Great Johnny Ace", initially sings of the rhythm and blues singer Johnny Ace, who is said to have shot himself in 1954, then goes on to reference John Lennon, as well as President John F. Kennedy, who was assassinated in 1963, the year "Beatlemania" started. The song also appears on Simon's Hearts and Bones (1983) album.
 Queen performed "Imagine" the night after Lennon's death at Wembley Arena in London.
 Freddie Mercury wrote "Life Is Real (Song For Lennon)" as a tribute to John Lennon. The song appeared on the Queen album Hot Space (1982).
 The Bellamy Brothers mentioned Lennon's death in their 1985 single "Old Hippie".
 The Cranberries' 1996 album To the Faithful Departed includes a song about the murder, "I Just Shot John Lennon".
 XTC performed "Rain" and "Towers of London" in Liverpool the night after Lennon's death.

Physical memorials

 In 1985, New York City dedicated an area of Central Park where Lennon had frequently walked, directly across from the Dakota, as Strawberry Fields. In a symbolic show of unity, countries from around the world donated trees, and the city of Naples, Italy, donated the Imagine mosaic centerpiece.
 On 9 October 2007, Ono dedicated a memorial called the Imagine Peace Tower, on the island of Viðey, off the coast of Reykjavík, Iceland. Each year, between 9 October and 8 December, it projects a vertical beam of light high into the sky in Lennon's memory.
 In 2009, the New York City annex of the Rock and Roll Hall of Fame hosted a special John Lennon exhibit that included many mementos and personal effects from Lennon's life, as well as the clothes he was wearing when he was murdered, still in the brown paper bag from Roosevelt Hospital.
 In 2018, Ono created an artwork in John Lennon's memory, titled "Sky", for MTA Arts & Design. The artwork was installed during the renovation of the 72nd Street station on the New York City Subway (served by the ), outside the Dakota.

Biographical films
 The Killing of John Lennon (2006), by Andrew Piddington, focuses on Chapman's life up to the murder.
 Chapter 27 (2007), a drama by Jarrett Schaefer based on Jack Jones's book "Let Me Take You Down", attempts a nonjudgmental portrayal of Chapman.
 The Lennon Report (2016) focuses on attempts by doctors and nurses to save Lennon's life.

Conspiracy theories
Central Intelligence Agency (CIA) and Federal Bureau of Investigation (FBI) surveillance of Lennon due to his left-wing activism and the actions of Chapman during the murder or subsequent legal proceedings have led to conspiracy theories postulating CIA involvement:
 Fenton Bresler, a barrister and journalist, raised the idea of CIA involvement in the murder in his book Who Killed John Lennon?,  published in 1990. Chapman allegedly may have been brainwashed by the CIA as an assassin, such as in "The Manchurian Candidate".
 Liverpool playwright Ian Carroll staged a drama, "One Bad Thing", conveying the theory Chapman was manipulated by a rogue wing of the CIA "who wanted Lennon off the scene".
 In a 2004 book, Salvador Astrucia argued that forensic evidence proves Chapman did not commit the murder.
 The 2010 documentary The Day John Lennon Died suggests that Jose Perdomo, the doorman at the Dakota, was a Cuban exile with links to the CIA and the Bay of Pigs invasion.

References

Works cited
  (Also published as The Murder of John Lennon, Mandarin Publishing, .)

Further reading

External links

 

John Lennon
1980 in music
1980 in New York City
Lennon, John
1980s crimes in New York City
1980s in Manhattan
Upper West Side
Crimes in Manhattan
Lennon, John
Lennon, John
Lennon, John
December 1980 crimes
December 1980 events in the United States
Lennon, John
Assassinations in the United States
Male murder victims